Netherlands competed at the 2022 Winter Paralympics in Beijing, China which took place between 4–13 March 2022. In total, eight competitors competed in two sports.

Administration

Retired wheelchair tennis player Esther Vergeer served as Chef de Mission.

Para-snowboarders Lisa Bunschoten and Chris Vos were the flagbearers for the Netherlands during the opening ceremony. Para-alpine skier Niels de Langen was the flagbearer during the closing ceremony.

Medalists

Competitors
The following is the list of number of competitors participating at the Games per sport/discipline.

Alpine skiing

Barbara van Bergen, Floris Meijer, Jeroen Kampschreur, Niels de Langen and Jeffrey Stuut competed in alpine skiing. The sit skis used by the sitting alpine skiers were enhanced based on research by the Delft University of Technology.

Men

Women

Snowboarding

Renske van Beek, Lisa Bunschoten and Chris Vos competed in snowboarding.

Banked slalom

Snowboard cross

Qualification legend: Q - Qualify to next round; FA - Qualify to medal final; FB - Qualify to consolation final

See also
Netherlands at the Paralympics
Netherlands at the 2022 Winter Olympics

References

Nations at the 2022 Winter Paralympics
2022
Winter Paralympics